The following is a list of indoor arenas in Greece, ordered by seating capacity.

Current arenas

See also
Basketball in Greece
List of indoor arenas in Europe

References

Indoor arenas in Greece
Greece
Basketball venues in Greece
Indoor arenas